Amadou Ba or Amadou Bâ may refer to:

Amadou Bâ (politician, born 1892), also known as Doudou Ba, Senegalese politician, adjunct to the mayor of Dakar
Amadou Ba (politician, born 1961), Senegalese politician, prime minister since 17 September 2022
Amadou Ba (basketball), basketball coach in the Burkina Faso men's national basketball team, 2017–
Amadou Ba (footballer) (born 1998), French professional footballer
Amadou Bâ (musician) (fl. 1980s), trumpeter and band leader of the Afro-jazz band Super Biton de Ségou until 1986
Amadou Dia Ba (born 1958), former Senegalese athlete
 Amadou Hampâté Bâ (c. 1901–1991), Malian writer and ethnologist

See also
 Amadou Onana (born 1991), Belgian professional footballer, full name Amadou Ba Zeund Georges Mvom Onana